The Cossack Whip is a 1916 American silent drama film directed by John H. Collins and starring Viola Dana, Richard Tucker and Robert Walker.

Plot summary 
Feodor Turov, chief of the Russian Czar's secret police, orders his Cossacks to attack a village he believes to be infested with rebels. The Cossacks attack the village and massacre almost everyone, and the young Katerina is whipped to death. Before escaping to England, her sister Darya swears to avenge her sister's death. Years later — now one of the world's most famous prima ballerinas — she returns to Russia. Turov falls in love with her and manages to secure a meeting. She coyly asks him to take her to see a prison first. As it turns out, what he has planned for her is nothing compared to what she has planned for him.

Cast
 Viola Dana as Darya Orlinsky
 Grace Williams as Katerina Orlinsky
 Robert Walker as Alexis 
 Frank Farrington as Ivan Turov — Cossack Officer
 Richard Tucker as Sergius Kordkin
 Sally Crute as 	Mme. Alla Pojeska
 William Wadsworth as Orlinsky — Darya's Father
 Robert Brower as Andre Lukovsky
 Saul Harrison as Misha Lukovsky
 Franklyn Hanna as Feodor Turov — Prefect of Police

References

Bibliography
 Paul C. Spehr & Gunnar Lundquist. American Film Personnel and Company Credits, 1908-1920. McFarland, 1996.

External links
 

1916 films
1916 drama films
1910s English-language films
American silent feature films
Silent American drama films
American black-and-white films
Films directed by John H. Collins
Edison Studios films
1910s American films